Acanthodica lignaris is a moth of the family Noctuidae. It is found in South America, including Peru and Brazil.

Catocalina
Moths of South America